Senegalese Republican Movement (in French: Mouvement Republicain Sénégalais) was a political party in Senegal, founded on July 3, 1977. MRS was led by Boabacar Gueye, who served as its general secretary.

MRS was legally recognized on February 2, 1979. MRS was then the fourth legal party in the country. MRS worked for a free market economy and a society based on Islamic values.

Source: Zuccarelli, François. La vie politique sénégalaise (1940-1988). Paris: CHEAM, 1988.

Political parties established in 1977
Political parties in Senegal